Vietnam participated in the 2013 World Games in Cali, Colombia on 29 June – 6 July 2013.

Vietnam sent 10 athletes which competed in 5 sports.

Medalists

References

Nations at the 2013 World Games
2013 in Vietnamese sport
Vietnam at multi-sport events